Phaclofen, or phosphonobaclofen, is a selective antagonist for the GABAB receptor. It was the first selective GABAB antagonist discovered, but its utility was limited by the fact that it does not cross the blood brain barrier.

References

GABAB receptor antagonists
Phosphonic acids
Chlorobenzenes